Diala is a genus of sea snails, marine gastropod mollusks in the family Dialidae.

Species
Species within the genus Diala include:
 Diala albugo (Watson, 1886)
 Diala almo Bartsch, 1915
 Diala exilis (Tryon, 1866)
 Diala lirulata Thiele, 1930
 Diala megapicalis Ponder & de Keyzer, 1992
 Diala semistriata (Philippi, 1849) - type species as Diala varia Adams A., 1861
 Diala stephensae (Baker, Hanna & Strong, 1930)
 Diala sulcifera (A. Adams, 1862) - synonym: Diala flammea (Pease, 1868)
 Diala suturalis (A. Adams, 1863) - synonym: Diala lauta (Adams)
 Diala virgata Hedley, 1899 (taxon inquirendum)
Species brought into synonymy
 Diala acuta Carpenter, 1864: synonym of Pseudodiala acuta (Carpenter, 1864)
 Diala africana Bartsch, 1915: synonym of Diala almo Bartsch, 1915
 Diala basispiralis (Chapman-Smith & Grant-Mackie, 1971): synonym of Diala semistriata (Philippi, 1849)
 Diala cacuminata Laseron, 1956: synonym of Diala semistriata (Philippi, 1849)
 Diala capensis G. B. Sowerby III, 1889: synonym of Alaba pinnae (Krauss, 1848)
 Diala conica Turton, 1932: synonym of Diala semistriata (Philippi, 1849)
 Diala cornea A. Adams, 1861: synonym of Alaba cornea (A. Adams, 1861)
 Diala diffilata Laseron, 1956: synonym of Alaba diffilata (Laseron, 1956)
 Diala electrina Carpenter, 1864: synonym of Lirobarleeia Ponder, 1983 
 Diala flammea Pease, 1868: synonym of Diala sulcifera (A. Adams, 1862)
 Diala fragilis Thiele, 1930: synonym of Alaba fragilis (Thiele, 1930)
 Diala fuscopicta E. A. Smith, 1890: synonym of Barleeia fuscopicta (E. A. Smith, 1890)
 Diala hartmeyeri Thiele, 1930: synonym of Alaba hartmeyeri (Thiele, 1930)
 Diala infrasulcata G.B. Sowerby III, 1892: synonym of Diala semistriata (Philippi, 1849)
 Diala lauta (Adams, 1862): synonym of Diala suturalis (A. Adams, 1863)
 Diala leithii (E. A. Smith, 1876): synonym of Mainwaringia leithii (E. A. Smith, 1876)
 Diala lirata Laseron, 1950: synonym of Diffalaba opiniosa Iredale, 1936
 Diala ludens Melvill & Standen, 1895: synonym of Diala albugo (Watson, 1886)
 Diala macula Nevill, 1885: synonym of Diala varia A. Adams, 1861: synonym of Diala semistriata (Philippi, 1849)
 Diala marmorea Carpenter, 1864: synonym of Pseudodiala acuta (Carpenter, 1864)
 Diala pinnae (Krauss, 1848): synonym of Alaba pinnae (Krauss, 1848)
 Diala planalba Laseron, 1956: synonym of Diala semistriata (Philippi, 1849)
 Diala polita Preston, 1905: synonym of Diala semistriata (Philippi, 1849)
 Diala simplex E. A. Smith, 1875: synonym of Barleeia simplex (E. A. Smith, 1875)
 Diala stricta Habe, 1960: synonym of Diala semistriata (Philippi, 1849)
 Diala tesselata Tenison-Woods, 1876: synonym of Alaba monile A. Adams, 1862
 Diala translucida Hedley, 1905: synonym of Styliferina translucida (Hedley, 1905)
 Diala trilirata Melvill, 1906: synonym of Diala semistriata (Philippi, 1849)
 Diala varia Adams A., 1861: synonym of Diala semistriata (Philippi, 1849)
 Diala vestigia Laseron, 1956: synonym of Diala semistriata (Philippi, 1849)
 Diala vitrea G. B. Sowerby III, 1915: synonym of Diffalaba vitrea (G. B. Sowerby III, 1915)
 Diala watsoni Laseron, 1956: synonym of Diala semistriata (Philippi, 1849)

References

External links
 Ponder W. F. & de Keyzer R. (1992). "A revision of the genus Diala (Gastropoda: Cerithioidea: Dialidae)". Invertebrate Taxonomy 6: 1019–1075.
 Gofas S., Le Renard J. & Bouchet P. (2001). "Mollusca", In: Costello M. J. et al. (Ed.) (2001). European register of marine species: a check-list of the marine species in Europe and a bibliography of guides to their identification. Collection Patrimoines Naturels 50: 180–213.

Dialidae